Star Bonifacio Echeverria, S.A. was a manufacturer of small arms (principally handguns and sub-machineguns) in the Basque region of Spain from about 1905 until 1997.

Company history

Bonifacio Echeverria and the ancestry of Star

The Eibar region has been a center of weapons development and manufacture for centuries, with "Spanish Steel" historically being a selling point with its reputation for quality and durability. When firearms came into being, Eibar retained its edge as a weapons manufacturing center. The oldest known ancestor of the Star lineage is José Cruz Echeverria, who made muzzle-loading firearms in the 19th century.

His two sons, Julián and Bonifacio, entered the firearms business about 1905. Thanks to a curious mechanism in the Spanish patent law, local firms were until 1986 free to produce foreign designs protected abroad if they weren't produced in Spain. So the brothers started to make the model 1908 pistol, substantially an unlicensed clone of Mannlicher M1900 in 6.35 mm (.25 ACP) caliber. Around 1910 Julián left the business and Bonifacio expanded and began improving their current offering. The Model 1914 was released with much the same mechanism as the 1908, but with further improvements to the ergonomics,

As is often the case with weapons makers, a government contract secured the success of the company. The firm was a sub-contractor to Gabilondo y Urresti in producing a version of the Gabilondo Ruby pistol for the French military during World War I. Additionally, Bonifacio Echeverria was directly contracted for a version of the 1914 Model pistol. The "Model 1 Militar" was a 7.65 mm (.32) caliber version of the Model 1914 designed for the French military, who referred to them as the Pistolet automatique, type Star.

The beginnings of Star as a brand

In 1919, Bonifacio formally registered the Star trade name, and all subsequent weapons were marked as such. Note that although some references say that the Basque and Spanish equivalents of Star are also registered (Izarra and Estrella), they seem to have never been marketed as such.

The classic era
Originally, Bonifacio had planned on producing a still more improved version of the model 1914, initially to meet a French follow-on contract for 50,000 pistols. However, the end of World War I led to the cancellation of the contract, and Echeverria decided that clones of the Colt M1911 were more commercially viable.

Development moved rapidly from pistols that looked like Colts to ones that operated on the Browning tilting breech method. The line was rapidly expanded to cover a broad range of pistols in all popular western calibers, as well as the almost uniquely Spanish 9 mm Largo. Additionally, a line of .25 ACP caliber vest pocket pistols were developed, including a series of popular .22 Long Rifle target pistols. These are all straight blowback models.

The modern era
In 1983 production of the classic models was largely ceased in favor of a new series of pistols taking most of their features from the Charles Petter SACM style of pistols (also seen in the SIG P210 and CZ-75). Namely, these all had inverted slide rails and closed cam path locking. Many also had modular (removable) trigger assemblies. Most were double-action, though some retained the classic style single-action lockwork.

The end
The 1990s were bad for defense companies all over the world. For the most part, companies in smaller markets either found their niche and flourished, or slowly perished. In Spain alone Star, Astra and CETME met their end.

The final years at Star saw a relative flurry of new models, and court challenges over restructuring plans and massive layoffs. Star filed for bankruptcy protection in late 1993 after taking out loans to invest in new CNC machinery. They were indirectly affected by the Asian economic crisis; Spanish banks tried to cover Asian investment losses by more aggressively collecting outstanding debt and renewing loans with less favorable terms for domestic companies. Star and Astra began cooperative investment and discussions of mergers in the mid 90s, but Astra was not in much better shape, so this eventually dragged both companies down.

Although rumours abounded that a large foreign company, like Beretta, would snap them up (as they indeed did with Sako) this was not to be. Employees of both companies, through their unions, tried to set up a cooperative to take control of the companies. They planned to upgrade operations again, but also ran into trouble overextending themselves financially, and eventually these organizations also sought protection under bankruptcy laws.

On May 27, 1997 both Star and Astra closed their doors, and were placed in the Spanish equivalent of Chapter Seven bankruptcy, under the control of a Basque regional judge. Eventually, an agreement was reached that settled sufficient outstanding debt, and allowed some of the machinery and the intellectual property to be resurrected in two new companies. Much machinery was also sold at auction to pay debtors. Apparently all unassembled or unsold barrels and frames were destroyed by government order when the company closed. Unregistered parts were retained and purchased by a custom smithing operation known as Ipar Guns.

Star and Astra combined into one company under the ASTAR name, with a new factory, which manufactures a range of new firearms with distribution in Spain and some South American countries.

Production and models

Pistols
 1905; patent of a semiautomatic pistol of the type hammerless caliber 6,35
 Model  1908: copy of the Mannlicher Model 1900 in 6,35 mm

 Model 1914: pistol of the Ruby type calibrates 25 the ACP, improved Mannlicher system caliber 7.65 mm For the French army.
 Izarra: pistol of the type hammerless caliber 25 the ACP produced between 1905 and 1906 in small. In 32 the ACP 1914 until 1921 of Ruby type.
 Star Model 1908, produced between 1908–1914, of Mannlicher pistols
 Star model 1919: Star mod.1919, lime 7,65mm and 6,35mm, Manlincher system, very compact, known as the pistol of the unionists of Confederación Nacional del Trabajo (anarchist) and the Unión General de Trabajadores (socialist).
 Star model 1920: pistol for the Civil Guard
 Star model 1921: Tenth generation of pistols for the Civil Guard. Hard variation of the Modelo1920. It does not have more of security of the firing pin on the butt, becomes to forge the tube so that he is more resistant, a security shipper, an aspect that is resembled the Colt M1911
 SIS – .32 auto = 7.65 mm pistols
 SS – 380 auto = 9mm short
 AS – 38 auto = 9 mm Bergmann-Bayard
 BS – 9 mm luger = 9mm Parabellum
 MS – 38 auto = or 9 mm Bergmann-Bayard
 PS – 45 auto or 9 mm
 Star Model A-40 or Star Model 1922: semiautomatic pistol of simple action of 9mm Long, produced between 1921 ET 1945, pistol would regulate of the Civil Guard.
 JO.LO.AR.: semi-automatic pistol chambered in a wide range of calibres with a .45 ACP Peruvian export variant.
 Star Model 1931
 Star Model IN-1934: lime 9mm short, Mannincher system, made for the use of police.
 Star Model To Super:
 Star Model B
 Super-Star: pistol of simple action produced of 1946 à 1983. It was a landmark in the manufacture of the company.
 SUPER-S: identical pistol to Super-Star in caliber 380 the ACP and of dimensions very reduced.
 Star Model BG
 Star Model BKS
 Star Model BM
 Star Model BKM: pistol of simple action 9mm Parabellum, produced of 1972 à 1997, identical model to STAR BM but with frame made in aircraft aluminum.
 Star Model C
 Star Model D: in SS and S (SS=.380) (S=Super.380 see above)
 Star Model D Plus
 Star Model F
 Star Model H
 Star Model I
 Star Model M
 Star Model MMS: 7.63 mm Mauser
 Star Model P
 Star Model PKM
 Star Model PD
 Star Model 1941-S: pistol of single-action 380 ACP produced from 1940 to 1983, resembled of the Model oA, but in very small dimensions. Models for military use.
 Star Model D -SS: Medium-sized pistol, single-action .380 ACP produced between 1930 and 1941. It was called the "Police and Pocket Model after it was adopted by the Spanish Police. It resembles the Model-A except it is a smaller pistol and looks very much like a Model 1911 Colt.
 Star Model SM Super: chambered in .380 ACP
 Star Model M28/M30/M31
 Star Model M40: .40 S&W single-action pistol.
 Star Model M43: 9mm
 Star Firestar M45: .45ACP  single-action pistol. Its weight is 2.5 lb with full Mag of 6 rounds and one in the chamber. Extended magazine with 7 rounds available.Trigger pull is 4.5 5 lb.
 Star Ultrastar
 Star Megastar
 Star Model 316

Submachine Guns
 Si35 models, RU35, and TN35: These models used  fixed wooden buttstock, and were chambered for the 9×23mm (9mm Largo cartridge). They differed slightly in rate of fire and design. Used in the Spanish Civil War.
 Star Model Z-45 model: This 9×23mm (9mm Largo) submachine gun used a 10 or 30-round magazine, was made in both fixed wood stock and folding stock versions, and was fitted with a muzzle brake/compensator very similar to that used on the M1921/28 Thompson submachine gun. The Z-45 had a fluted chamber to ease extraction with the powerful 9 mm Largo cartridge. Most Z-45s were issued with a 30-round box magazine, but a short 10-round magazine was available for police or for guarding prisoners. The folding stock was similar in design to that of the German MP40.  The Star Z-45 saw service in Spain, Cuba, Chile, Portugal (no longer), Saudi Arabia and Angola. It was used for the first time in combat in Sidi Ifni.
 Star Model Z-62 and Z-63: Entered service with the Spanish Army in 1963. The Z-62 uses the 9×23mm Largo ammunition, while the Z-63 uses 9×19 Parabellum. The two models differ internally, but outside they are practically identical. All parts of the Z-62/Z-63 are constructed of metal.
 Star Model Z-70 and Z-70B: After the entrance of Spain into NATO, the Z-70 was issued from the outset in 9×19mm Parabellum NATO caliber.
 Star Model Z-75 model: The Z-75 was a developmental model that introduced the use of plastic/composite materials in order to reduce weight. The Z-75's design was a radical change from earlier Star submachine guns, and resembles the Israeli UZI in appearance.  The later Z-84 is nothing more than a revised version of the Z-75.
 Star Model Z-84: In 1985, the Spanish Army introduced the revised Star Z-84 for service with some units in the Spanish Army.  The new Z-84 was designed to operate reliably on semi-jacketed hollow-point or soft-point (expanding bullet) ammunition as well as military 9mm NATO full-metal-jacket cartridges, and could be fitted with 25 or 30-round magazines. It was originally envisioned that the Z-84 would replace all submachine guns then in service, but a decrease in reliance on submachine guns as a primary small arm for the Spanish armed forces resulted in a decision to retain the Z-70 for substitute issue on an as-needed basis. The Z-84 itself was largely replaced by the Heckler & Koch MP5, but is still used by units of the Spanish Navy, Guardia, and Police units.  In the Spanish armed forces, the Z-84 is colloquially known as "the Zeta".

Star Pistol model 1919. "Sindicalista" Model

In 1919 Bonifacio Echeverria  was interested in the patent of the Belgian Fabrique Nationale on the  Colt 1911 pistol. The intention of  Echeverria was to design a pistol more to the taste of Eibar.

Echeverria created a  6.35mm caliber pistol that served as base  for other models. With a frame clearly inspired by Colt and a slide similar to that of the Italian Beretta.
 
By 1929 models with calibers of 6.35mm, 7.65mm and 9mm corto had been developed. The 7.65mm caliber model, denominated the "Model Polícia", allegedly began to be used by the gunmen of the C.N.T in Barcelona and Zaragoza. Supposedly the pistol was carried hung by a string from the belt which went through a pocket with the bottom cut out of it, thus suspended down the inside of the trouser leg, to avoid detection by Police patrols.

Code and year of manufacture

After 1927 all the Spanish arms that are proven in the Proving stand Celebrate of Eibar are marked with recording, normally done on the frame, in which it appears the year of manufacture codified in letters.

Table of correspondence between letters and years of manufacture.

See also
Astra-Unceta y Cia SA, another former Spanish handgun manufacturer
ASTAR
CETME
Llama

References

External links
 Star-Firearms.com, an information website
 9 mm Largo website
 Modern Firearms – Handguns
 Modern Firearms – Submachine Guns
 Star Modelo Super B Pictorial

Firearm manufacturers of Spain
Defunct manufacturing companies of Spain
Defunct firearms manufacturers
Privately held companies of Spain
Eibar
Spanish companies established in 1905
Manufacturing companies established in 1905